Ruth D. Etzioni is a biostatistician who develops statistical computer models to research cancer progression. She is the Rosalie and Harold Rea Brown endowed chair at the Fred Hutchinson Cancer Research Center.

Life 
Etzioni completed a B.S. in statistics at the University of Cape Town in 1985. She earned a M.S. (1987) and Ph.D. (1990) in Statistics at Carnegie Mellon University. She was a postdoctoral researcher in the department of biostatistics at the University of Washington from 1991 to 1992.

Etzioni joined the faculty at the Fred Hutchinson Cancer Research Center in 1992 as an associate in the biostatistics program. Her research interests include the development and implementation of statistical methods for prostate cancer studies. She held multiple positions before her promotion to full member of the public health sciences division in 2002. Etzioni was elected a fellow of the American Statistical Association in April 2016. As of 2016, her research focuses on the development of statistical computer models to learn about the latent process of cancer progression from observed data on disease incidence and mortality. Etzioni became the inaugural recipient of the Rosalie and Harold Rea Brown endowed chair in 2020.

References 

Living people
Year of birth missing (living people)
Place of birth missing (living people)
University of Cape Town alumni
Carnegie Mellon University alumni
Cancer researchers
American women statisticians
Biostatisticians
20th-century American mathematicians
21st-century American mathematicians
20th-century American women scientists
21st-century American women scientists
American medical researchers
Women medical researchers
Fellows of the American Statistical Association
Fred Hutchinson Cancer Research Center people